Oistins Bay is located southeast of Carlisle Bay, close to the southernmost point of Barbados, South Point.

Bays of Barbados